The 1952 Yugoslav Second League season would be the 6th season of the Second Federal League, the second level association football competition of SFR Yugoslavia, since its establishment in 1946. It was cancelled before the start of the competition and the clubs were relocated to third level.

Teams
A total of twelve teams were supposed to contest the league, including nine sides from the 1951 season, two clubs relegated from the 1951 Yugoslav First League and one side promoted from the third tier leagues played in the 1951 season. 

Spartak Subotica and Napredak Kruševac were relegated from the 1951 Yugoslav First League after finishing in the 11th and 12th place of the league table. Rudar Trbovlje and Sloga Rankovićevo secured their status after additional play-off.

Play-off

See also
1952 Yugoslav First League
1952 Yugoslav Cup

References

  

Yugoslav Second League seasons
Yugo
2
Yugo
2